IRPS may refer to:

 Graduate School of International Relations and Pacific Studies (IR/PS), the original name of the School of Global Policy and Strategy, at the University of California, San Diego
 Image Receiving and Processing Station, part of the ground station for DubaiSat-1
 Indian Railway Personnel Service, a cadre of the Indian Government
 Institute for Religious and Pastoral Studies, the original name of the University of Dallas School of Ministry

See also
 IRP (disambiguation)
 IRPSA, Iran Refined Petroleum Sanctions Act of 2009